Garriott may refer to:

 Cecil Garriott (1916–1990), American Baseball player
 Owen K. Garriott (1930–2019), American NASA astronaut 
 Richard Garriott (born 1961), British-American video game developer and entrepreneur
 Robert Garriott (born 1956), American video game developer and entrepreneur